The name Goni has been used to name four tropical cyclones in the Western Pacific Ocean. The variant Koni was used in 2003 before the spelling was corrected by the WMO Typhoon Committee. The name was contributed by South Korea and is a Korean word for swan.

 Severe Tropical Storm Koni (2003) (T0308, 08W, Gilas)
 Tropical Storm Goni (2009) (T0907, 08W, Jolina)
 Typhoon Goni (2015) (T1515, 16W, Ineng) a typhoon that made landfall in the Philippines as a category 4, then made landfall again as a category 3.
 Typhoon Goni (T2019, 22W, Rolly) – made landfall as a Category 5–equivalent super typhoon on Catanduanes in the Philippines and in Vietnam as a tropical storm.

The name Goni was retired following the 2020 typhoon season and was replaced with Gaenari, which refers to the spring flowering shrubs with yellow flowers (Forsythia).

Pacific typhoon set index articles